Anders "Masken" Carlsson (born 25 November 1960 in Gävle, Sweden) is a Swedish retired ice hockey center who played parts of three seasons with the New Jersey Devils in the National Hockey League and many seasons in the Elitserien for Brynäs IF, Södertälje SK, VIK Västerås HK and Leksands IF.  In addition to playing in the 1987 Canada Cup, he represented Sweden six times at the World Championships, winning gold medals in 1987 and 1991, and silver medals in 1986, 1990 and 1997. He is currently an amateur scout for the Colorado Avalanche He is currently General Manager of SHL-team Rögle BK.

Career statistics

Regular season and playoffs

International

References

1960 births
Living people
Colorado Avalanche scouts
New Jersey Devils players
People from Gävle
Swedish expatriate ice hockey players in the United States
Swedish ice hockey centres
VIK Västerås HK players
Sportspeople from Gävleborg County